Stuart Shapiro may refer to:
 Stuart S. Shapiro, producer, writer, director, and Internet entrepreneur
 Stuart L. Shapiro (born 1947), American theoretical astrophysicist

See also
 Stewart Shapiro (born 1951), professor of philosophy